The 2019 IHF World Men's Handball Championship was the 26th event hosted by the International Handball Federation and held in Denmark and Germany from 10 to 27 January 2019. It was the first IHF World Men's Handball Championship to include more than one host country. It was also the first time a unified Korean team participated.

Denmark, in a clean sweep, won their first title by defeating Norway 31–22 in the final. This was Norway's second final in a row and the first final since 1995 between two nations who had not won before. France captured the bronze medal after a 26–25 win over Germany.

The tournament set a new spectator record with 906,283, helped by the fact that there were two home teams. Biggest number of spectator at single events was 19,250 at Germany's matches in the main round.

Bidding process
Denmark/Germany presented a bid and were up against competitors from Poland and Slovakia/Hungary. The International Handball Federation announced on 28 October 2013 that Denmark/Germany would be awarded the 2019 World Men's Handball Championship.

Format
This edition saw a format change back to the one used in 2011. The 24 teams were split into four groups, in which the first three teams qualified for the main round. The bottom three teams of each group played the Presidents' Cup to determine the positions from 13 to 24. In the main round, the 12 teams were split into two groups. Their points from the preliminary round against the other qualified team were carried over, and the best two placed teams in each main round group qualified for the semifinals, while the third- and fourth ranked teams played placement matches. From the semifinals on, a knockout system was used.

Venues
Following is a list of all venues and host cities which was used. All venues have a capacity of more than 10,000 spectators. The final was held in Jyske Bank Boxen in Herning, Denmark.

Qualification

Qualified teams

1 Bold indicates champion for that year. Italic indicates host country for that year
2 The associations of South Korea and North Korea were invited by the International Handball Federation to enter a unified team in the championship. South Korea, which had 11 previous appearances (1986, 1990, 1993, 1995, 1997, 1999, 2001, 2007, 2009, 2011, 2013), originally qualified as the semifinalist of the 2018 Asian Championship.
3 From both German teams only East Germany was qualified in 1990

Draw
The draw took place on 25 June 2018 in Copenhagen, Denmark.

Seeding
The seedings and draw procedure were announced on 22 June 2018.

3 Official name since February 2019. During the championships: Former Yugoslavian Republic of Macedonia (FYROM).
4 Later replaced by a  team

Squads

Referees
The referee pairs were selected on 25 October 2018.

Preliminary round
The provisional schedule was confirmed on 28 June 2018 and the final schedule was announced on 31 October 2018.

Tiebreakers
In the group stage, teams are ranked according to points (2 points for a win, 1 point for a draw, 0 points for a loss). After completion of the group stage, if two or more teams have scored the same number of points, the ranking will be determined as follows:

Highest number of points in matches between the teams directly involved;
Superior goal difference in matches between the teams directly involved;
Highest number of goals scored in matches between the teams directly involved (or in the away match in case of a two-team tie);
Superior goal difference in all matches of the group;
Highest number of plus goals in all matches of the group;
If the ranking of one of these teams is determined, the above criteria are consecutively followed until the ranking of all teams is determined. If no ranking can be determined, a decision shall be obtained by IHF through drawing of lots.

During the group stage, only criteria 4–5 apply to determine the provisional ranking of teams.

All times are local (UTC+1).

Group A

Group B

Group C

Group D

Presidents Cup

21st–24th place playoffs

21st–24th place semifinals

23rd place game

21st place game

17th–20th place playoffs

17th–20th place semifinals

19th place game

17th place game

13th–16th place playoffs

13th–16th place semifinals

15th place game

13th place game

Main round
Points obtained against qualified teams from the same group were carried over.

Group I

Group II

Final round

Bracket

Semifinals

Seventh place game

Fifth place game

Third place game

Final

Final ranking
Places 1–8 and 13–24 were decided by play–off or knock–out. Teams finishing fifth in the main round are ranked 9th to 10th and teams ranked sixth are ranked 11th and 12th. In case of a tie in points gained, the goal difference of the preliminary round were taken into account.

Awards

All-Star Team
All-Star Team of the tournament and MVP.

Statistics

Top goalscorers

Source: IHF

Top goalkeepers

Source: IHF

International broadcasters
Source:

Television and video streaming

Host broadcasters

Other broadcasters

Radio and audio streaming

References

External links
Official website
IHF website

2019, Men
Handball, World Championship
Handball, World Championship
World Championship, Men
World Championship, Men, 2019
World Championship, Men, 2019
World Men's Handball Championship